Kilemary (Kÿlemar; , Kilemar) is an urban locality (an urban-type settlement) and the administrative center of Kilemarsky District of the Mari El Republic, Russia. As of the 2010 Census, its population was 4,073.

Administrative and municipal status
Within the framework of administrative divisions, Kilemary serves as the administrative center of Kilemarsky District. As an administrative division, the urban-type settlement of Kilemary, together with fourteen rural localities, is incorporated within Kilemarsky District as Kilemary Urban-Type Settlement (an administrative division of the district). As a municipal division, Kilemary Urban-Type Settlement is incorporated within Kilemarsky Municipal District as Kilemary Urban Settlement.

Notable residents 

Sergey Chilikov (1953–2020), photographer
Vladislav Zotin (born 1942), President of Mari El 1991–1997

References

Notes

Sources

Urban-type settlements in the Mari El Republic
